is a 24-episode anime television series directed by Shinichirō Watanabe. It was animated by studio Bones, in commemoration of the studio's 20th anniversary and the 10th anniversary of record label FlyingDog. It aired from April 11 to October 3, 2019, on Fuji TV's +Ultra programming block. A manga adaptation by Morito Yamataka began serialization in Young Ace in May 2019 and ended in July 2020. The manga is licensed in English by Yen Press and is slated for release in 2020. An English dub version premiered worldwide on Netflix on August 30, 2019.

Plot
In the future on a partially terraformed Mars, Tuesday Simmons runs away from her affluent lifestyle as the wealthy daughter of a politician and makes her way to Alba City to pursue her dream of being a musician with just a suitcase and her Gibson acoustic guitar. On her first day in the city, she crosses paths with Carole Stanley, an orphaned refugee from Earth and another aspiring musician who plays the piano. The two decide to team up as a singer-songwriter duo under the name Carole & Tuesday.

Characters

Main

A 17-year-old girl who came to Mars at a young age. A keyboardist, she originally performed on the street in between part-time jobs before meeting Tuesday. She plays a red keyboard piano.

A 17-year-old rich girl who runs away from her home in Herschel City and has a chance meeting with Carole. She plays the acoustic guitar.

A former rock drummer and self-proclaimed former big-time manager who discovers Carole and Tuesday and decides to help them become famous.

A boy acquainted with Gus who first discovered Carole and Tuesday during their first guerilla live performance together. He works as a sound technician for Ertegun.

A famous model who works alongside Tao in order to become recognized as a singer.

A music producer who uses advanced AI in order to create high-selling performers. He is coolly professional and admits to preferring the company of AIs to people.

Angela's mother and agent, biologically male before becoming intersexed from exposure to the Martian environment.

Artists

A popular DJ with a pompous attitude, initially bearing a grudge on Carole and Tuesday over their rough first meeting. He later appears as a guest judge for the Mars' Brightest semi-finals.

A popular singer.

A popular singer.

Vocalist of the band Omega.

A highly-respected artist who stopped making public appearances after being diagnosed with an incurable disease that made them wheelchair-bound. Biologically male, Desmond identified themselves as non-binary after being exposed to the Martian environment. Though they end up in a coma after having Carole and Tuesday meet them for a final song, Desmond awakens in the series finale to make a final public appearance.

A retired singer whom Carole is a longtime admirer of and an old friend of Gus. Despite her past success, Flora has a history of depression and substance abuse.

A rapper who emigrated from Earth. His real name is Amer Souleyman and is a childhood friend of Carole.

Mars' Brightest

Judges

The head judge for Mars' Brightest.

One of the Mars' Brightest judges.

An artificial intelligence in the form of a robot dog that serves as a guest judge in the first two weeks of Mars' Brightest.

Contestants

, Maika Loubté (vocals) (French)
A French-singing Mars' Brightest contestant with a dangerous obsession with Tuesday.

A popular internet personality who participates in Mars' Brightest to boost his profile.

An a capella group of drag queens, who are eliminated from the quarter-finals due to their verbally explicit lyrics.

A pair of elderly brothers who perform thrash metal music.

A seemingly rough-looking contestant who mixes rap with opera.
GGK

A contestant who claims to be a vessel through which the universe sings.

Others

Tuesday's mother, the governor of Hershall Province and a candidate for the presidency of Mars.

Tuesday's older brother.

Angela's manager and biggest fan.

An AI robot ordered by Roddy who helped Carole & Tuesday for the production of their first music video, only to be revealed as a con artist.

A journalist covering the Mars presidential election.

A legendary record producer who works with Carole and Tuesday. Known for his harsh methods.

A stalker who has a dangerous obsession with Angela.

Media

Anime
The 24-episode anime television series by studio Bones is directed by Motonobu Hori with Shinichirō Watanabe as supervising director. Eisaku Kubonouchi provides the original character designs, while Tsunenori Saito adapts them for animation. The series aired in Fuji TV's +Ultra timeslot from April 11 to October 3, 2019, and is streamed exclusively on Netflix. The series is in commemoration of the 20th anniversary of Bones and the 10th anniversary of record label FlyingDog. A special broadcast, Carole & Tuesday Golden Week Special, was aired on Line Live on May 1, 2019. It included a behind-the-scenes documentary, recording sessions with the singers, and the music video for the opening theme song "Kiss Me". Netflix holds international distribution rights, and the first half of Carole & Tuesday was released worldwide on August 30, 2019 with an English dub. The other half was released on December 24.

Starting on June 28, 2019, an eight-episode series of Flash-animated shorts titled Car & Tue began streaming on the series' official YouTube channel. The anime shorts center on "light-hearted, comical dialogue" between characters in the series.

Music

The opening and ending theme songs for the first half respectively are "Kiss Me" and "Hold Me Now", both performed by Nai Br.XX and Celeina Ann. The opening and ending theme songs for the second half respectively are "Polly Jean", performed by Nai Br.XX and Celeina Ann and "Not Afraid", performed by Alisa. Mocky composes the music at FlyingDog. Additional music is provided by other musicians, including:

Alison Wonderland (Alexandra Sholler)
D.A.N.
Cero
Flying Lotus (Steven Ellison)
Mark Redito
Madison McFerrin
Taku Takahashi
Taro Umebayashi
Taylor McFerrin
Thundercat (Stephen Lee Bruner)

The first soundtrack album, covering the first 12 episodes and comprising 20 tracks, was released on July 31, 2019. The album consists of songs written for the series' characters by the contributing musicians. The first insert song used in episodes 1, 2 and 12, titled "The Loneliest Girl", was released on digital streaming services on June 27, 2019.

Episodes
All episode titles are taken from pop and rock songs.

Media release
FlyingDog released Carole & Tuesday across two volumes, in DVD and Blu-ray media formats.

Manga
A manga adaptation, illustrated by Morito Yamataka, began serialization in Kadokawa Shoten's Young Ace magazine on May 2, 2019. The manga ended in July 2020. Yen Press announced the license of the manga at Anime NYC in November  2019 and released it from December 2020 to January 2022.

Reception
James Beckett of Anime News Network commended the show, giving it an A overall, citing "genuinely delightful" music, a "colorful, well-realized world", and stated that the English dub "serves the anime even better than its original Japanese track".

In her review of the show for Syfy, Laura Dale criticized the LGBTQ representation in the show, arguing that the show often uses "minority characters as punchlines, stereotypes for plot progression, or...presents one particular minority group as dangerous violent monsters created by poor environmental factors" and stating that while the show "really sweet, soft queer energy," she remained disappointed that the show had "repeated harmful representations of queer characters."

Carole & Tuesday was awarded Best Score and is nominated for eight other categories including "Anime of the Year" at the 4th Crunchyroll Anime Awards. It was also nominated for Outstanding Achievement for Storyboarding in an Animated Television/Broadcast Production at the 47th Annie Awards.

References

External links
 

2019 anime television series debuts
+Ultra
Anime with original screenplays
Bones (studio)
Fuji TV original programming
Kadokawa Shoten manga
Mars in television
Music in anime and manga
Netflix original anime
Seinen manga
Sentai Filmworks
Yen Press titles